Mount Joy is an unincorporated community in Scioto County, in the U.S. state of Ohio.

History
A post office called Mount Joy was established in 1871, and remained in operation until 1918. The community was named for Thomas Mt. Joy, a land agent.

Notable person
Wayne Blackburn, a baseball coach and team manager, was born at Mount Joy in 1914.

References

Unincorporated communities in Scioto County, Ohio
Unincorporated communities in Ohio